Downwardly Mobile is a British television sitcom series produced by Portman Productions in association with Yorkshire Television. It aired on ITV from 21 July to 1 September 1994.  Starring Frances de la Tour, Philip Jackson, Stephen Tompkinson and Josie Lawrence, it was written by Alistair Beaton and Barry Pilton and directed by Martin Dennis.

Cast
 Frances de la Tour as Rosemary
 Philip Jackson as Clem
 Stephen Tompkinson as Mark
 Josie Lawrence as Sophie

Episodes
"Another Black Wednesday" (21 July 1994)
"Just a Few Essentials" (28 July 1994)
"Underarm Combat" (4 August 1994)
"Out of Their Depth" (11 August 1994)
"A Slow Buck" (18 August 1994)
"Troubles with My Aunt" (25 August 1994)
"Grapefruit and Roses" (1 September 1994)

References

External links
 
 
 

1990s British sitcoms
1994 British television series debuts
1994 British television series endings
English-language television shows
ITV sitcoms
Television series by ITV Studios
Television series by Yorkshire Television
Television shows set in England